François Fresneau (29 September 1703 – 25 June 1770) was a French botanist and scientist, and is credited for having written the first scientific paper on rubber. He also was known for having the first early idea of waterproof material.

References

1703 births
1770 deaths
18th-century French botanists